Siim Pohlak (born 14 May 1985 in Tallinn) is an Estonian businessman and politician. He has been member of XIV Riigikogu.

In 2014 he graduated from Tallinn University in public and business management.

Since 2014 he is a member of Estonian Conservative People's Party.

References

1985 births
Conservative People's Party of Estonia politicians
Estonian businesspeople
Living people
Members of the Riigikogu, 2019–2023
Members of the Riigikogu, 2023–2027
Politicians from Tallinn
Tallinn University alumni